South River Terminal is one of two passenger river terminals in Moscow. It was built in 1985 according to the design of architect A.M.Rukhlyadev. It is situated in the territory of Nagatinskiy Zaton raion of Moscow.

External links
  South River Terminal in Rubrikon encyclopedia (payment access)
 Photograph of the terminal

Transport infrastructure completed in 1985
Ports and harbours of Russia
Water transport in Russia
1985 establishments in Russia